Nightwalker statutes were English statutes, before modern policing, allowing or requiring night watchmen to arrest those found on the streets after sunset and hold them until morning.  Foremost among them was the Statute of Winchester of 1285 and re-adopted or amended several times until its repeal in 1827 that stated "if any stranger do pass by them, he shall be arrested until morning." Such power was interpreted to extend not only to the watchmen themselves, but also to assistants, and allowed the arrest and detention of all persons.

See also
 Village lock-up
 Hue and cry
 Policing in the United Kingdom
 Security
 Security officer
 Watchman (law enforcement)

References

English criminal law
Law enforcement terminology
Legal history of England
Medieval English law
Warrants